Marama Russell (c.1875–1952) was a notable New Zealand midwife and tribal leader. Of Māori descent, she identified with the Nga Puhi, Ngati Whatua and Te Roroa iwi. She was born in Waimamaku, Northland, New Zealand in about 1875.

References

1870s births
1952 deaths
New Zealand Māori midwives
Te Roroa people